Dùqiáo (杜桥) may refer to the following locations in China:

 Duqiao, Jing County, Hebei, town
 Duqiao, Linhai, town in Linhai, Zhejiang